The 1953–54 Northern Football League season was the 56th in the history of the Northern Football League, a football competition in Northern England.

Clubs

The league featured 14 clubs which competed in the last season, no new clubs joined the league this season.

League table

No changes following this season.

References

1953-54
4